Ranald Roderick Macdonald (1945–2007) was a British mathematician and psychologist. He was known for his contribution to the foundations of significance testing.

References

1945 births
2007 deaths
20th-century British mathematicians
21st-century British mathematicians
British psychologists
20th-century psychologists